Holbox ("black hole" in Yucatec Maya) is an island in the Mexican state of Quintana Roo, located on the north coast of the Yucatán Peninsula. Holbox Island is part of the Municipality of Lázaro Cárdenas and also part of the Yum Balam Biosphere Reserve.

The island's main industry is fishing. However, the island is developing a growing tourist industry in the form of whale shark viewing. Lobster is the main product of this fishing and many of the dishes made on the island center around lobster or other seafood.

The island is accessed by ferry from the mainland town of Chiquilá, and has virtually no cars, with transport by most residents and tourists by golf cart or moped. A few charter airlines fly to Holbox from Cancún and Playa del Carmen; there is a small airstrip called Holbox Aerodrome that can accommodate five-seater and 13-seater Cessna aircraft.

Vehicle entry is not allowed at Holbox in order to protect the environment and to prevent the streets from accumulating sand.

Holbox has several alternatives to enjoy nature, but the one that attracts most visitors is the experience of swimming with the impressive whale shark from June to September, an opportunity found in very few parts of the world. During hurricane season, the island is often evacuated as it can get directly damaged by hurricane winds.

History 
The first written mentions of the island were in 1852 from a document sent by Don Bartolomé Magaña to the Governor of Yucatán. The adjacent mainland was frequently attacked by the Maya therefore people sought refuge on this island. The government wanted to keep people from living on this island but the citizens refused to leave their homes. Hurricanes in 1886 completely destroyed the island, but the island was rebuilt afterward.

Kiteboarding in Holbox
Holbox has one of the safest beaches for learning how to kiteboard. Conditions are ideal for beginners, as the beach has shallow waters, no big obstacles on the wide and long beach, many days of wind during the winter months, and a nearby school with professional instructors. Advanced riders can find also very good conditions when the north or south winds reach 25 knots or more. The climate is subhumid warm, creating a stable and consistent temperature year-round.

Bioluminescence
At the western tip of the island, there is a lagoon called Punta Cocos, where bioluminescence can be observed on dark nights.

Gallery

References

External links 

Municipality of Lázaro Cárdenas

Islands of Quintana Roo
Geography of Mesoamerica
Populated places in islands of Mexico
Places with bioluminescence
Islands of Mexico